Qarqan, also rendered as Qurqan, may refer to:
 Qurqan, Iran
 Qarqan, Isfahan, Iran
 Qarqan-e Olya, Iran
 Qarqan-e Sofla, Iran
 Qarqan (town), Bayingolin, Xinjiang, China
 Qarqan (county), Bayingolin, Xinjiang, China
 Qarqan (river), Bayingolin, Xinjiang, China